SC Heerenveen in European football includes the games which are played by SC Heerenveen in competitions organised by UEFA.

Totals

Top scorers

Competitions by Countries

Most Played Team

Results

(1990–2000)

1995-96 season

1996-97 season

1997-98 season

1998-99 season

Heerenveen won 4–1 on aggregate.

Varteks won 5–4 on aggregate.

1999-2000 season

SC Heerenveen won 4–0 on aggregate.

West Ham United won 2–0 on aggregate.

(2001–2010)

2000-01 season

2002-03 season

National București won 3–2 on aggregate.

2003-04 season

Heerenveen won 5–1 on aggregate.

Heerenveen won 2–1 on aggregate.

Villareal won 2–1 on aggregate.

2004-05 season

Heerenveen won 5-0 on aggregate.

Newcastle United won 4–2 on aggregate.

2005-06 season

Heerenveen won 5–2 on aggregate.

Steaua București won 3–2 on aggregate.

2006-07 season

Heerenveen won 3-0 on aggregate.

2007-08 season

Helsingborgs won 8–6 on aggregate.

2008-09 season

Heerenveen won 6–3 on aggregate.

2009-10 season

Heerenveen 1–1 PAOK on aggregate. Heerenveen won on away goals.

(2010–2020)

2012-13 season

Heerenveen won 4–1 on aggregate.

Molde won 4–1 on aggregate.

Notes

References

Dutch football clubs in international competitions
SC Heerenveen

External links
 SC Heerenveen in www.uefa.com
 Official web site of SC Heerenveen